Lili Anna Tóth (born 17 September 1998) is a Hungarian Olympic athlete.

Tóth is from Dombóvár, and competed as a junior winning a gold medal from the 2013 European Youth Olympic Festival (EYOF), a silver from the European Cross Country Junior Championships and a third place from the 2014 Youth Olympics.

In July 2021 she was confirmed as part of the Hungarian team for the delayed 2020 Summer Games for the 3000 metres steeplechase. She ran a personal best time at the Olympics of 9:30.96.

References

1998 births
Living people
Hungarian female steeplechase runners
Hungarian Athletics Championships winners
Athletes (track and field) at the 2014 Summer Youth Olympics
Athletes (track and field) at the 2020 Summer Olympics
Olympic athletes of Hungary